The 2014–15 Indiana Pacers season was Indiana's 48th season as a franchise and 39th season in the NBA. The Pacers finished fourth in Central Division and ninth in Eastern Conference. The Pacers missed the playoffs for the first time since 2010 after a 56–26 mark from the previous season, following two-straight Eastern Conference Finals appearances. Before the start of the season, storm clouds gathered when superstar forward Paul George  seriously injured his leg during a Team USA scrimmage. The injury required immediate surgery. George was originally to be ruled out for the entire season, but as the season progressed, he was talking about returning. He also announced before the season that he would be wearing number 13 and earned the nickname 'PG-13' (his initials and new jersey number). As the season winded down and after months of rehabilitation, George made his regular-season debut on April 5 in a home game against the Miami Heat. He finished the game with 13 points off the bench and received a standing ovation. George was only able to play the final six games of the season.

This was the last time the Pacers missed the playoffs until the 2020–21 season.

Offseason

Draft picks

Standings

Game log

Preseason

|- style="background:#bfb;"
| 1
| October 7
| Minnesota
| 
| George Hill (17)
| Lavoy Allen (7)
| George Hill (7)
| Bankers Life Fieldhouse 13,160
| 1–0
|- style="background:#fcc;"
| 2
| October 10
| Orlando
| 
| Donald Sloan (16)
| Luis Scola (9)
| George Hill (4)
| Bankers Life Fieldhouse 16,111
| 1–1
|- style="background:#fcc;"
| 3
| October 12
| @ Dallas
| 
| C. J. Miles (19)
| Lavoy Allen (8)
| Damjan Rudež (6)
| American Airlines Center 17,971
| 1–2
|- style="background:#fcc;"
| 4
| October 15
| @ Cleveland
| 
| Chris Copeland (16)
| Ian Mahinmi (7)
| George Hill (5)
| Cintas Center 10,250
| 1–3
|- style="background:#bfb;"
| 5
| October 18
| Dallas
| 
| Chris Copeland (22)
| George Hill (9)
| George Hill (6)
| Bankers Life Fieldhouse 15,748
| 2–3
|- style="background:#fcc;"
| 6
| October 21
| @ Minnesota
| 
| Donald Sloan (19)
| Roy Hibbert (9)
| Donald Sloan (5)
| Target Center 8,660
| 2–4
|- style="background:#bfb;"
| 7
| October 23
| @ Charlotte
| 
| C. J. Miles (23)
| Luis Scola (12)
| Donald Sloan (8)
| Time Warner Cable Arena 8,529
| 3–4

Regular season

|- style="background:#cfc;"
| 1
| October 29
| Philadelphia
| 
| Roy Hibbert (22)
| Donald Sloan (10)
| Donald Sloan (6)
| Bankers Life Fieldhouse18,165
| 1–0
|- style="background:#fcc;"
| 2
| October 31
| Memphis
| 
| Chris Copeland (16)
| Lavoy Allen (10)
| Donald Sloan (7)
| Bankers Life Fieldhouse14,441
| 1–1

|- style="background:#fcc;"
| 3
| November 1
| @ Atlanta
| 
| Chris Copeland (21)
| Roy Hibbert (12)
| Donald Sloan (7)
| Philips Arena19,118
| 1–2
|- style="background:#fcc;"
| 4
| November 4
| Milwaukee
| 
| Chris Copeland (19)
| Lavoy Allen (12)
| Donald Sloan (6)
| Bankers Life Fieldhouse15,012
| 1–3
|- style="background:#fcc;"
| 5
| November 5
| @ Washington
| 
| Donald Sloan (31)
| Chris Copeland (12)
| Donald Sloan (7)
| Verizon Center15,268
| 1–4
|- style="background:#fcc;"
| 6
| November 7
| @ Boston
| 
| Roy Hibbert (22)
| Roy Hibbert (11)
| Sloan, Copeland, Price (4)
| TD Garden17,122
| 1–5
|- style="background:#fcc;"
| 7
| November 8
| Washington
| 
| Solomon Hill (28)
| Luis Scola (8)
| A. J. Price (4)
| Bankers Life Fieldhouse17,302
| 1–6
|- style="background:#cfc;"
| 8
| November 10
| Utah
| 
| Roy Hibbert (29)
| Lavoy Allen (15)
| Sloan, Scola, Allen (3)
| Bankers Life Fieldhouse12,513
| 2–6
|- style="background:#cfc;"
| 9
| November 12
| @ Miami
| 
| Chris Copeland (17)
| Roy Hibbert (15)
| Sloan & Scola (3)
| AmericanAirlines Arena19,658
| 3–6
|- style="background:#fcc;"
| 10
| November 14
| Denver
| 
| A. J. Price (14)
| Ian Mahinmi (10)
| Sloan & Price (4)
| Bankers Life Fieldhouse16,286
| 3–7
|- style="background:#cfc;"
| 11
| November 15
| @ Chicago
| 
| S. Hill, Scola, Price (21)
| Solomon Hill (12)
| Donald Sloan (7)
| United Center22,248
| 4–7
|- style="background:#cfc;"
| 12
| November 19
| Charlotte
| 
| Roy Hibbert (18)
| Roy Hibbert (11)
| Donald Sloan (6)
| Bankers Life Fieldhouse14,748
| 5–7
|- style="background:#fcc;"
| 13
| November 22
| Phoenix
| 
| Rodney Stuckey (14)
| Mahinmi, Scola (10)
| Donald Sloan (6)
| Bankers Life Fieldhouse16,870
| 5–8
|- style="background:#cfc;"
| 14
| November 24
| @ Dallas
| 
| Donald Sloan (29)
| Luis Scola (11)
| Sloan & Stuckey (5)
| American Airlines Center19,850
| 6–8
|- style="background:#fcc;"
| 15
| November 26
| @ San Antonio
| 
| Rodney Stuckey (22)
| Lavoy Allen (9)
| Donald Sloan (6)
| AT&T Center18,581
| 6–9
|- style="background:#cfc;"
| 16
| November 28
| Orlando
| 
| Rodney Stuckey (24)
| Lavoy Allen (14)
| Donald Sloan (6)
| Bankers Life Fieldhouse18,165
| 7–9
|- style="background:#fcc;"
| 17
| November 29
| @ Cleveland
| 
| David West (14)
| Ian Mahinmi (10)
| Donald Sloan (6)
| Quicken Loans Arena20,562
| 7–10

|- style="background:#fcc;"
| 18
| December 2
| @ Phoenix
| 
| C.J. Miles (17)
| Roy Hibbert (10)
| C.J. Watson (7)
| US Airways Center15,059
| 7–11
|- style="background:#fcc;"
| 19
| December 4
| @ Portland
| 
| Rodney Stuckey (16)
| Ian Mahinmi (10)
| Rodney Stuckey (5)
| Moda Center19,191
| 7–12
|- style="background:#fcc;"
| 20
| December 5
| @ Sacramento
| 
| David West (16)
| West & Scola (8)
| Stuckey, S. Hill & Watson (3)
| Sleep Train Arena15,512
| 7–13
|- style="background:#fcc;"
| 21
| December 8
| Atlanta
| 
| Stuckey & Miles (15)
| Luis Scola (9)
| Solomon Hill (6)
| Bankers Life Fieldhouse14,519
| 7–14
|- style="background:#fcc;"
| 22
| December 10
| L.A. Clippers
| 
| C.J. Miles (30)
| Luis Scola (14)
| C.J. Watson (7)
| Bankers Life Fieldhouse16,392
| 7–15
|- style="background:#fcc;"
| 23
| December 12
| @ Toronto
| 
| Solomon Hill (16)
| David West (7)
| David West (5)
| Air Canada Centre19,800
| 7–16
|- style="background:#fcc;"
| 24
| December 13
| Portland
| 
| C.J. Watson (23)
| Rodney Stuckey (14)
| David West (6)
| Bankers Life Fieldhouse17,206
| 7–17
|- style="background:#cfc;"
| 25
| December 15
| L.A. Lakers
| 
| Stuckey & Miles (20)
| Rodney Stuckey (10)
| Rodney Stuckey (7)
| Bankers Life Fieldhouse15,261
| 8–17
|- style="background:#fcc;"
| 26
| December 17
| @ L.A. Clippers
| 
| West & Miles (20)
| Lavoy Allen (14)
| Solomon Hill (6)
| Staples Center19,060
| 8–18
|- style="background:#fcc;"
| 27
| December 20
| @ Denver
| 
| David West (19)
| West & Allen (20)
| David West (5)
| Pepsi Center14,125
| 8–19
|- style="background:#cfc;"
| 28
| December 21
| @ Minnesota
| 
| C.J. Miles (28)
| Roy Hibbert (8)
| Donald Sloan (7)
| Target Center12,687
| 9–19
|- style="background:#cfc;"
| 29
| December 23
| New Orleans
| 
| George Hill (15)
| West & Allen (7)
| David West (5)
| Bankers Life Fieldhouse17,336
| 10–19
|- style="background:#fcc;"
| 30
| December 26
| @ Detroit
| 
| Roy Hibbert (19)
| David West (11)
| C.J. Watson (6)
| The Palace of Auburn Hills13,408
| 10–20
|- style="background:#cfc;"
| 31
| December 27
| @ Brooklyn
| 
| Rodney Stuckey (20)
| C.J. Watson (9)
| Rodney Stuckey (8)
| Barclays Center17,732
| 11–20
|- style="background:#fcc;"
| 32
| December 29
| Chicago
| 
| Chris Copeland (17)
| Scola & Allen (8)
| Lavoy Allen (6)
| Bankers Life Fieldhouse18,165
| 11–21
|- style="background:#cfc;"
| 33
| December 31
| Miami
| 
| C.J. Miles (25)
| Roy Hibbert (10)
| West, Miles & Watson (4)
| Bankers Life Fieldhouse18,165
| 12–21

|- style="background:#cfc;"
| 34
| January 2
| @ Milwaukee
| 
| C.J. Miles (22)
| West & Sloan (8)
| Donald Sloan (6)
| BMO Harris Bradley Center16,238
| 13–21
|- style="background:#fcc;"
| 35
| January 4
| @ L.A. Lakers
| 
| C.J. Miles (19)
| Roy Hibbert (11)
| Donald Sloan (9)
| Staples Center18,997
| 13–22
|- style="background:#cfc;"
| 36
| January 5
| @ Utah
| 
| Roy Hibbert (22)
| Roy Hibbert (8)
| David West (6)
| EnergySolutions Arena17,378
| 14–22
|- style="background:#fcc;"
| 37
| January 7
| @ Golden State
| 
| Solomon Hill (21)
| Lavoy Allen (9)
| David West (6)
| Oracle Arena19,596
| 14–23
|- style="background:#cfc;"
| 38
| January 9
| Boston
| 
| Roy Hibbert (19)
| Roy Hibbert (11)
| Stuckey, Sloan & Hibbert (4)
| Bankers Life Fieldhouse18,165
| 15–23
|- style="background:#fcc;"
| 39
| January 10
| @ Philadelphia
| 
| David West (28)
| Roy Hibbert (13)
| C.J. Watson (4)
| Wells Fargo Center17,496
| 15–24
|- style="background:#fcc;"
| 40
| January 13
| Minnesota
| 
| C.J. Miles (22)
| Roy Hibbert (8)
| Sloan & Watson (5)
| Bankers Life Fieldhouse16,781
| 15–25
|- style="background:#fcc;"
| 41
| January 16
| Detroit
| 
| Roy Hibbert (14)
| Ian Mahinmi (9)
| Sloan & Stuckey (5)
| Bankers Life Fieldhouse17,558
| 15–26
|- style="background:#fcc;"
| 42
| January 17
| @ Charlotte
| 
| David West (19)
| Roy Hibbert (14)
| Sloan & Stuckey (4)
| Time Warner Cable Arena19,285
| 15–27
|- style="background:#fcc;"
| 43
| January 19
| @ Houston
| 
| C.J. Miles (23)
| Ian Mahinmi (14)
| Donald Sloan (6)
| Toyota Center18,266
| 15–28
|- style="background:#fcc;"
| 44
| January 21
| @ Atlanta
| 
| C.J. Miles (18)
| David West (11)
| Donald Sloan (5)
| Philips Arena15,045
| 15–29
|- style="background:#fcc;"
| 45
| January 23
| @ Miami
| 
| Luis Scola (14)
| David West (9)
| Rodney Stuckey (3)
| AmericanAirlines Arena19,693
| 15–30
|- style="background:#cfc;"
| 46
| January 25
| @ Orlando
| 
| David West (20)
| Roy Hibbert (13)
| C.J. Watson (8)
| Amway Center16,704
| 16–30
|- style="background:#fcc;"
| 47
| January 27
| Toronto
| 
| Rodney Stuckey (22)
| Roy Hibbert (8)
| David West (5)
| Bankers Life Fieldhouse16,204
| 16–31
|- style="background:#cfc;"
| 48
| January 29
| New York
| 
| Rodney Stuckey (22)
| Roy Hibbert (8)
| David West (6)
| Bankers Life Fieldhouse15,665
| 17–31
|- style="background:#fcc;"
| 49
| January 31
| Sacramento
| 
| West & Miles (17)
| Roy Hibbert (7)
| C.J. Watson (5)
| Bankers Life Fieldhouse18,165
| 17–32

|- style="background:#cfc;"
| 50
| February 4
| Detroit
| 
| George Hill (20)
| Roy Hibbert (12)
| George Hill (6)
| Bankers Life Fieldhouse15,892
| 18–32
|- style="background:#cfc;"
| 51
| February 6
| Cleveland
| 
| C.J. Miles (26)
| David West (13)
| George Hill (7)
| Bankers Life Fieldhouse18,165
| 19–32
|- style="background:#cfc;"
| 52
| February 8
| @ Charlotte
| 
| C.J. Watson (22)
| Luis Scola (14)
| G. Hill, Scola, S. Hill & Watson (3)
| Time Warner Cable Arena16,991
| 20–32
|- style="background:#fcc;"
| 53
| February 9
| San Antonio
| 
| Rodney Stuckey (18)
| David West (18)
| David West (7)
| Bankers Life Fieldhouse16,691
| 20–33
|- style="background:#cfc;"
| 54
| February 11
| @ New Orleans   
| 
| G. Hill & West (17)
| Ian Mahinmi (8)
| George Hill (9)
| Smoothie King Center17,074
| 21–33
|- style="text-align:center;"
| colspan="9" style="background:#bbcaff;"|All-Star Break
|- style="background:#cfc;"
| 55
| February 20
| @ Philadelphia
| 
| Rodney Stuckey (30)
| West & Hibbert & Scola (4)
| G. Hill & West & Stuckey & Miles (4)
| Wells Fargo Center16,777
| 22–33
|- style="background:#cfc;"
| 56
| February 22
| Golden State
| 
| Rodney Stuckey (30)
| C.J. Miles (9)
| Stuckey & Miles (5)
| Bankers Life Fieldhouse16,777
| 23–33
|- style="background:#fcc;"
| 57
| February 24
| @ Oklahoma City
| 
| C.J. Miles (21)
| Roy Hibbert (10)
| George Hill (8)
| Chesapeake Energy Arena18,203
| 23–34
|- style="background:#cfc;"
| 58
| February 27
| Cleveland
| 
| Rodney Stuckey (19)
| George Hill (10)
| George Hill (12)
| Bankers Life Fieldhouse18,165
| 24-34

|- style="background:#cfc;"
| 59
| March 1
| Philadelphia
| 
| George Hill (17)
| Roy Hibbert (15)
| Stuckey & Hill (4)
| Bankers Life Fieldhouse16,581
| 25–34
|- style="background:#cfc;"
| 60
| March 4
| New York
| 
| George Hill (21)
| Ian Mahinmi (8)
| George Hill (6)
| Bankers Life Fieldhouse15,981
| 26–34
|- style="background:#cfc;"
| 61
| March 6
| Chicago
| 
| Solomon Hill (16)
| David West (10)
| George Hill (9)
| Bankers Life Fieldhouse18,165
| 27–34
|- style="background:#cfc;"
| 62
| March 7
| @ New York
| 
| Rodney Stuckey (17)
| West & Hibbert (11)
| Rodney Stuckey (4)
| Madison Square Garden19,812
| 28–34
|- style="background:#cfc;"
| 63
| March 10
| Orlando
| 
| Rodney Stuckey (34)
| Scola & Mahinmi (10)
| Rodney Stuckey (7)
| Bankers Life Fieldhouse17,295
| 29–34
|- style="background:#cfc;"
| 64
| March 12
| Milwaukee
| 
| Rodney Stuckey (25)
| Luis Scola (15)
| Rodney Stuckey (6)
| Bankers Life Fieldhouse15,729
| 30–34
|- style="background:#fcc;"
| 65
| March 14
| Boston
| 
| George Hill (30)
| Hibbert & Mahinmi (7)
| George Hill (8)
| Bankers Life Fieldhouse18,165
| 30–35
|- style="background:#fcc;"
| 66 
| March 16
| Toronto
| 
| George Hill (23)
| David West (9)
| Stuckey & Hill (4)
| Bankers Life Fieldhouse17,060
| 30–36
|- style="background:#fcc;"
| 67
| March 18
| @ Chicago
| 
| Solomon Hill (17)
| Luis Scola (7)
| David West (7)
| United Center21,753
| 30–37
|- style="background:#fcc;"
| 68
| March 20
| @ Cleveland
| 
| George Hill (24)
| Luis Scola (11)
| Watson & Hill (5)
| Quicken Loans Arena20,562
| 30–38
|- style="background:#fcc;"
| 69
| March 21
| Brooklyn
| 
| George Hill (18)
| Ian Mahinmi (7)
| George Hill (9)
| Bankers Life Fieldhouse16,453
| 30–39
|- style="background:#fcc;"
| 70
| March 23
| Houston
| 
| C.J. Watson (23)
| Roy Hibbert (10)
| West & Watson (5)
| Bankers Life Fieldhouse16,201
| 30–40
|- style="background:#cfc;"
| 71
| March 25
| @ Washington
| 
| George Hill (29)
| David West (11)
| George Hill (9)
| Verizon Center18,514
| 31–40
|- style="background:#fcc;"
| 72
| March 26
| @ Milwaukee
| 
| C.J. Miles (26)
| Luis Scola (9)
| C.J. Watson (7)
| BMO Harris Bradley Center15,366
| 31–41
|- style="background:#cfc;"
| 73
| March 29
| Dallas
| 
| C.J. Miles (28)
| Roy Hibbert (7)
| Solomon Hill (6)
| Bankers Life Fieldhouse17,358
| 32–41
|- style="background:#fcc;"
| 74
| March 31
| @ Brooklyn
| 
| George Hill (28)
| Luis Scola (9)
| Watson & David West (6)
| Barclays Center16,756
| 32–42

|- style="background:#fcc;"
| 75
| April 1
| @ Boston
| 
| George Hill (21)
| David West (8)
| George Hill (6)
| TD Garden18,624
| 32–43
|- style="background:#cfc;"
| 76
| April 3
| Charlotte
| 
| Rodney Stuckey (15)
| Luis Scola (11)
| George Hill (10)
| Bankers Life Fieldhouse18,165
| 33–43
|- style="background:#cfc;"
| 77
| April 5
| Miami
| 
| Luis Scola (23)
| Luis Scola (12)
| Rodney Stuckey (7)
| Bankers Life Fieldhouse18,165
| 34–43
|- style="background:#cfc;"
| 78
| April 8
| @ New York
| 
| George Hill (20)
| Roy Hibbert (11)
| Donald Sloan (6)
| Madison Square Garden19,812
| 35–43
|- style="background:#cfc;"
| 79
| April 10
| @ Detroit
| 
| Stuckey & Miles (24)
| Roy Hibbert (11)
| George Hill (9)
| Palace of Auburn Hills18,561
| 36–43
|- style="background:#cfc;"
| 80
| April 12
| Oklahoma City
| 
| C.J. Miles (30)
| Hibbert & Miles (10)
| George Hill (7)
| Bankers Life Fieldhouse18,165
| 37–43
|- style="background:#cfc;"
| 81
| April 14
| Washington
| 
| C.J. Miles (25)
| Roy Hibbert (12)
| George Hill (10)
| Bankers Life Fieldhouse18,165
| 38–43
|- style="background:#fcc;"
| 82
| April 15
| @ Memphis
| 
| C.J. Miles (26)
| G. Hill & Mahinmi (5)
| George Hill (6)
| FedExForum17,109
| 38–44
|- style="background:#fcc;"

Injuries

Roster

Player statistics

Regular season

Player Statistics Citation:

Transactions

Trades

Free agents

Re-signed

Additions

Subtractions

Awards

References

External links
 2014–15 Indiana Pacers preseason at ESPN
 2014–15 Indiana Pacers regular season at ESPN

Indiana Pacers seasons
Indiana Pacers
Pace
Pace